Eraguene  is a town and commune in Jijel Province, Algeria. According to the 1998 census it has a population of 4088.

Notable people
Patrice Latron (born 1961 in Bida), French Prefect and senior civil servant

References

Communes of Jijel Province